You Are My Sunshine is an album by Elizabeth Mitchell released in 2002. The album is a collection of children's music played in various styles, including folk, gospel, reggae and rock. It features covers of a variety of songs by other artists, among them "Hey Bo Diddley" by Bo Diddley, "Car Car" by Woody Guthrie, Cat Stevens' "Here Comes My Baby" and "Goodnight Irene" by Lead Belly.

Track listing
 So Glad I'm Here
 Skip To My Lou
 Ladybug Picnic
 Hey Bo Diddley
 Crawdad
 Alphabet Dub
 Car Car
 Ooby Dooby
 Goin Down the Road
 Black Jack Baby
 Jubilee
 Here Comes My Baby
 Three Is the Magic Number
 Froggy Went A Courtin
 Goodnight Irene
 You Are My Sunshine

References

2002 albums
Elizabeth Mitchell (musician) albums